The 2008-09 Biathlon World Cup/Mass start Men will start on January 11, 2009 in Oberhof and will finish on March 29, 2009 in Khanty-Mansiysk at the final event of the season. The defending titlist is Ole Einar Bjørndalen of Norway.

Competition format
In the mass start, all biathletes start at the same time; the first across the finish line wins. In this  competition, the distance is skied over five laps; there are four bouts of shooting (two prone, two standing, in that order) with the first shooting bout being at the lane corresponding to your bib (Bib #10 shoots at lane #10 regardless of position in race). The rest of the shooting bouts are at the lane of the position they arrived (Arrive at the lane in fifth place, shoot at lane five). As in sprint races, competitors must ski one 150 m penalty loop for each miss. Here again, to avoid unwanted congestion, World Cup Mass starts are held with only the 30 top ranking athletes on the start line (half that of the Pursuit as here all contestants start simultaneously).

2007-08 Top 3 Standings

Medal winners

Final standings

References

Biathlon World Cup - Mass Start Men, 2008-09